The AC72 (America's Cup 72 class) is a class of wingsail catamarans built to a box rule, which governs the construction and operation of yachts competing in the 2013 Louis Vuitton and the America's Cup races. The class was subsequently replaced by the smaller AC50 class.

Background
Following the 2010 America's Cup, where the Golden Gate Yacht Club's USA 17 trimaran defeated the catamaran Alinghi 5, it was decided by the winners that the next America's Cup competition would be sailed in catamarans in the hope of making the sport more attractive to television audiences. At the same time a smaller sister class, the AC45, was developed to allow teams to practice and adjust to the new formula as well as create a greater exposure of sailing to the general public with the America's Cup World Series.

Specifications
The AC72 has the following maximum specifications:

overall length: 
waterline length: 
beam: 
weight: 
maximum draught: 
crew: 11

Maximum Speed

Using foils for the first time in the America's Cup the AC72 was expected to sail faster than the wind: upwind at 1.2 times the speed of the true wind, and downwind at 1.6 times the speed of the true wind. But in fact it proved faster, averaging about 1.8 times the speed of the wind with peaks slightly over 2.3. A multiple of 2.79 times wind speed was achieved by Emirates Team New Zealand in practice, which sailed at 44.15 knots (81 km/h, 50 mph) in 15.8 knots of wind on July 18, 2013.

Typical racing speeds are over 30 knots (55 km/h, 34 mph) with the boats capable of sailing well over 40 knots (74 km/h, 46 mph) in the right conditions. The fastest race speed recorded was on Emirates Team New Zealand which was 47.57 knots (88 km/h, 55 mph) in 21.8 knots of wind (2.2 times the wind speed) on September 24, 2013.

Features 

 Pedestals
 Multi speed winches
 Backstays
 Crossbeams
 Wing Pod
 Digital Performance Indicators
 Soft Sails
 Wing-controlled cables
 3 separate cockpits
 Buttons on wheels

In competition

The boats have been used in the 2013 Louis Vuitton Cup and the 2013 America's Cup. By mid-June 2013, all boats had "lined up" and conducted trials against each other on the planned race track in San Francisco Bay, notably Oracle Team USA vs. Artemis Racing and Emirates Team New Zealand vs. Luna Rossa Challenge.

List of AC72 catamarans

Incidents
On 17 October 2012, Oracle Racing's AC72 pitchpoled (somersaulted) and capsized, causing severe damage to the yacht. The wingsail was completely destroyed while being swept under the Golden Gate Bridge by a strong ebb tide.

On 9 May 2013, Artemis Racing's AC72 pitchpoled and broke apart, resulting in the death of crew member Andrew Simpson.

The other two teams, Luna Rossa Challenge, and Team New Zealand, both suffered minor setbacks, including hitting seals and damaging their wing sails, resulting in loss of sailing time.

See also
 List of multihulls

References

External links 

America's Cup yachts
Catamarans
Box rule sailing classes
2013 America's Cup